Nandej is a census town in Ahmedabad district in the Indian state of Gujarat.

Demographics
 India census, Nandej had a population of 7639. Males constitute 53% of the population and females 47%. Nandej has an average literacy rate of 70%, higher than the national average of 59.5%: male literacy is 78%, and female literacy is 60%. In Nandej, 12% of the population is under 6 years of age.

References

Cities and towns in Ahmedabad district